Indiana Blast was an American soccer team, founded in 1996. The team was a member of the United Soccer Leagues, played in the USISL and A-League (1997–2004) until folding at the end of the 2004 season.

The Blast played their home games at Kuntz Memorial Stadium in Indianapolis, Indiana. The team's colors were white and blue for its last four years after four years with red and black as its colors. Peter Baah and Larry Harmon served as general managers.

Year-by-year

Honors
 USISL Pro League North Central Division Champions 1998

Competition History
Officially announced a press conference on September 30, 1996, the Blast signed its first player that November in goalkeeper standout from Yugoslavia and of MLS Mile Milovac and signed its second star player in Marc LeBere who came over on transfer from the Philadelphia Freedom after scoring 13 goals for Philadelphia, LeBere was a premier striker and expected to lead this new franchise in scoring. LeBere was a two time All-American in high school and a collegiate national champion. The club played its first match at Kuntz Stadium on April 25, 1997, a 2–0 loss to eventual A-League champion Milwaukee Rampage in front of 2,886 fans. The team claimed its first victory on May 9, beating the Cincinnati Riverhawks 4–0.

By August, the team's original owner, businessman Ferid Poturkovic, had sold the club to MorSports, Inc. On the day the sale was announced, the Blast beat the Chicago Stingers 2–0 to clinch a playoff berth with their fifth consecutive victory to end the regular season. Two weeks later, the Blast came from 2–0 down to defeat the Cleveland Caps 3–2 and win a first-round playoff game. The Blast  then defeated Chicago 1–0 on August 22 to make it to the Pro League quarterfinals, where they fell 6–0 to the Charlotte Eagles.

The 1998 season was the best in the club's history, as the Blast went 15–3 in league play (17–4 overall) and won the North Central Division's regular-season championship. The Chicago Stingers exacted their revenge for 1997's playoff defeat, though, as they beat the Blast 3–0 on August 21, 1998 in a first-round playoff match. The year would end with the Blast winning "Organization of the Year" honors from the USISL and earning promotion to the A-League.

In its first A-League game, the Blast won away to Tennessee Rhythm 3–1, but finished a mere point out of the playoff race with a 13–15 record, having lost the final postseason spot to the El Paso Patriots by virtue of a tiebreaker.

Though the Blast struggled to a 9–15–4 record in 2000, they qualified for the playoffs and absorbed a 7–0 pounding at the hands of the Minnesota Thunder in the first round. The club never qualified for postseason play again.

Original coach Jimmy McDonald stepped down after the 2000 season and was replaced by Bret Hall, who had coached the Chicago Stingers and Sockers to three consecutive championships. For health reasons, Hall was forced to relinquish his duties before ever coaching a game and he was replaced by assistant Ian Martin, the former head coach at Butler University in Indianapolis. Martin's only season at the helm resulted in an 8–18–0 record in 2001.

Former French professional and Mauritanian international Eric Descombes took over as player-coach for the 2002 season, which saw the team go 6–18–4, including a stretch of 16 games over two months in which it won just one match. A highlight was a 2–2 draw against Rochester Raging Rhinos in a nationally-televised game on August 17 that drew a then-club-record 4,557 fans (a figure that would be topped on July 13, 2003 when 5,140 saw a 3–2 loss to the Pittsburgh Riverhounds).

McDonald returned to the sidelines for the 2003 season, but it was the worst in the club's history, as they continued losing and controversy dogged the Blast from the season's start. McDonald  resigned for the final time after a horrendous start and was replaced by assistant Mike Sanich. Before the 3–23–2 season was over, player Peter Baah had taken the reins. It would be the Blast's last season in the A-League.

A move to the Premier Development League for the 2004 season infused the club with young talent, but the results weren't much better as the Blast finished 5–12–1 under coach John Dolinsky (who was first replaced by player Mark Allen and then by Baah before the season's end). The team's final match ever was a 3–2 loss to the Kalamazoo Kingdom at home on July 17, 2004. The final victory in club history came the night before, a 7–3 home decision over the Kansas City Brass.

In its history, the Blast established quite a rivalry with the Cincinnati Riverhawks, as the teams met 25 times. Indiana won 12, Cincinnati 11 and there were 2 draws in the series. At the other end of the spectrum, Indiana went just 2–15–1 in 18 matches against the Minnesota Thunder. In eight seasons, the club won 67, lost 114 and tied 11 in league play.

Coaches
  Jimmy McDonald 1994–2000, 2003
  Bret Hall 2001
  Ian Martin 2001
  Eric Descombes 2002
  Mike Sanich 2003
  Peter Baah 2003, 2004
  John Dolinsky 2004
  Mark Allen 2004

Stadium
 Kuntz Memorial Stadium, Indianapolis, Indiana 1997–2004

References

Blast
Soccer clubs in Indiana
Defunct Premier Development League teams
A-League (1995–2004) teams
USISL teams
1997 establishments in Indiana
2004 disestablishments in Indiana
Association football clubs established in 1997
Association football clubs disestablished in 2004